States of Grace (also known as God's Army 2: States of Grace) is a 2005 drama film directed by Richard Dutcher and starring Lucas Fleischer, Jeffrey Scott Kelly, and J. J. Boone. It tells the story of two Mormon missionaries in Santa Monica, California. While it features none of the original main characters from God's Army, it is set in the same location and has some of the original secondary characters.

Plot
In Santa Monica, California, a pair of Mormon missionaries—by-the-book Elder Farrell (Lucas Fleischer), and his soon-to-leave companion, Elder Lozano (Ignacio Serricchio)—proselytize until they are caught between a gang drive-by shooting targeting nearby thugs. The shootout kills one thug and wounds another, Carl (Lamont Stephens), whom Elder Lozano saves. After being released from the hospital, Carl tracks down the two missionaries, thanking Lozano for saving his life, who gives Carl a Book of Mormon.

Later, the missionaries notice an unconscious street preacher lying behind a Dumpster. Despite Farrell's hesitation, the missionaries bring the man—later identified as Louis (Jo-sei Ikeda)—to rest in their apartment. Meanwhile, Carl, who has been reading the Bible and Book of Mormon, is eager to be baptized and begins taking lessons from the missionaries. While they do so, the missionaries ask their next-door neighbor, Holly (Rachel Emmers), to check on the homeless preacher in their home. Upon their return, they have dinner with Holly and Louis and continue to do so for a few days.

In this time, the missionaries learn that Louis once was a preacher who lost his congregation due to alcoholism and that Holly—a struggling actress—acted in a few adult movies, her parents back home discovering and cutting off contact with her as a result. Elder Farrell promises that God will never stop loving her regardless of her mistakes.

At a local ward luau, another missionary interviews Carl for baptism, teaching him the story of Ammon, a missionary who teaches a group of people  to give up their weapons and bury them deep in the ground, vowing never to use them again. The night before his baptism, Carl buries his weapons in the yard and Elder Lozano baptizes him the following day.

As Carl is confirmed a member of the LDS Church on Sunday, his younger brother, Todd, seeks retribution for the death of Carl's friend. The gang responsible for the shootout corners Todd and stabs him to death. The police inform Carl and his grandmother Mae of Todd's death later that day. Carl digs up his weapon and hunts down the man responsible for Todd's death with fellow gang members. Though they find the man, Carl reneges his desire for vengeance and lets him live, leaving another gang member to kill the man to Carl's dismay. Distraught, Carl returns to the ocean in which he was baptized, throwing his gun into the wake.

At night, Elder Lozano awakens to find Elder Farrell's bed empty with evidence indicating he was with Holly. The following morning, Farrell sobs during breakfast, realizing the consequences of his sexual indiscretion with Holly. Farrell confesses his mistake to the mission president, who sends a replacement missionary in a van to take Elder Farrell home. Prior to his leaving, Lozano finds Farrell locked in the bathroom, having slit his wrists in a suicide attempt. Lozano and other missionaries rush Farrell to the hospital.

In the hospital, Holly repeats Elder Farrell's words to him that God will love him regardless of his mistakes. After his release, Elder Farrell prepares to return home dishonored. Drawn to a Lutheran Church “living Nativity” display nearby their apartment, he cries as he holds the Nativity scene's baby Jesus.

In a mid-credits scene, Louis preaches a lively sermon to a packed congregation in a meetinghouse that he acquired from a widow.

Cast
 Lucas Fleischer as Elder Scott Farrell, a by-the-book LDS missionary
 Ignacio Serricchio as Elder Lozano, Farrell's missionary companion and former gang member
 Rachel Emmers as Holly, a struggling actor and the missionaries' neighbor
 Jo-sei Ikeda as Louis, a homeless street preacher the missionaries take into their home
 Lamont Stephens as Carl, a gang member wounded in a drive-by shooting and rescued by the missionaries
 Allen Maldonado as Rob
 J.J. Boone as Mae, Carl's grandmother
 Jeffrey Scott Kelly as Elder Mangum 
 Adam Conger as Elder Collens 
 Allison Evans as Doctor 
 Richard Franklin as Gang Banger 
 Jennifer Freeman as Jennifer 
 Brett Granstaff as Elder Stearman 
 Aaron J. Hartnell as Burn victim 
 Samantha Klein as Sister Hershey 
 Rege Lewis as Jordan 
 Danny Martinez   
 Michael May as Elder Myers 
 Aiyani Mersai as Sister Savea 
 John Pentecost as President Beecroft 
 Karyna Shackelford as Mary 
 Julia Silverman as Nurse 
 Desean Terry as Banks 
 Randy Tobin as Beach Guy

Production

Music

Ben Carson composed the film's original score. The CD release of the soundtrack is evenly divided between dialog excerpts and original score (all even-numbered tracks are short dialog excerpts from the film and all odd-numbered tracks are music).

Reception

Box office
States of Grace earned a total of $42,321 in its opening weekend and $203,144 in North America at 35 theaters.

Critical response
The review aggregator website Rotten Tomatoes reported a 82% approval rating with an average rating of 7.75/10, based on 11 reviews.

Scott Foundas of Variety called the film, "An uncompromising, disconsolate pic about crises of faith." Jeff Shannon of The Seattle Times gave the film 3/4 stars, called it, "upright and thoughtful," and praised the production quality, "noble purpose," and screenwriting. Sean P. Means of The Salt Lake Tribune praised Dutcher himself, the story, cinematography, and cast (Serricchio in particular). Jeff Vice of Deseret News gave the film 3.5/5 stars, and praised the performances of Serrcchio, Emmers, and Stephens, the cinematography, writing, and the soundtrack. But criticized the run-time and the performance of Fleischer. Carol Cling of The Las Vegas Review-Journal gave the film a C+, criticizing the pace and message of Dutcher's writing, had mixed feeling on the character development, and praised Serricchio's performance.

Controversy
In San Diego, California, a local theater was showing States of Grace. A box office employee told customers that it was "being advertised as a Christian film, but it's really a Mormon film."  Some Mormons were outraged and planned a protest, but the film's director, Richard Dutcher called them off, preferring to keep the peace, "turn the other cheek" and let the film speak for itself.

References

External links
  A Wayback Machine archive of the official website
 

2005 films
2005 crime drama films
Mormon cinema
Films set in California
Films directed by Richard Dutcher
American gangster films
Works about Mormon missionaries
2000s English-language films